The Yalukit or Yalukit-willam people are a constituent clan of the Boonwurrung peoples. The Yalukit are the earliest Aboriginal inhabitants of the central bay-side region of Melbourne (Birrarung-ga). The Yalukit have inhabited the central bay-side areas of Melbourne for thousands of years.

Country
Yalukit territory extends eastwards from the Werribee River, through to Williamstown, Sandridge and St Kilda.

Etymology 
The name Yalukit-willam means 'river home' or 'people of the river', referring to the Yarra and Maribyrnong River.

Traditional Life 
The Yalukit traditionally practiced tool manufacturing, ochre collection, and burning of the landscape to allow for renewal of the flora and fauna. The Yalukit land currently occupied by Central Melbourne is a major meeting place for the Kulin Nation where social events, ceremonies, marriages, initiations, trade, and judicial matters are conducted. Yalukit people are of the Bundjil moiety and so were required to marry outside of the clan to people of the Waa moiety in the surrounding Kulin nation; married Yalukit women would move away from Yalukit lands to live with other clans. Yalukit people hunted kangaroo, birds, eels and other seafood, and gathered edible plants such as wattle gum. While men primarily hunted the large game, women were also capable of doing so. The work required to sustain the clan could take as little as five hours a day. Food was shared freely with those less-able within the clan.

Decision-making within the clan was conducted by a senior council which met to discuss serious issues such as clan movements, inter-tribal business, or to resolve interpersonal conflict. As winter approached, the clan would move upstream to drier areas that were less prone to flooding. 

Clothing was sewn from animal skins and furs including possum and kangaroo and also woven from plant materials. Hair was kept long and decorated with claws, animal teeth, earthenware, and other accessories. The ears and nose could be pierced with animal bones and the face painted with ochre.

Place names in Melbourne from the Yalukit dialect
 Williamstown: Kertbooruc/ Koort-boork-boork - (a clump of she-oak trees at that site).
 Kororoit Creek: Kororoit - male kangaroo, said to be from kure (kangaroo).

Notes

Citations

Sources 

Aboriginal peoples of Victoria (Australia)